Somerset is an unincorporated census-designated place in Waltz Township, Wabash County, in the U.S. state of Indiana.

History
The post office at Somerset has been in operation since 1848. An old variant name of the community was called Springfield.

Somerset was relocated when the Mississinewa dam was created. The original Somerset was located near the dam, and is now underwater.

Geography

Demographics

References

Census-designated places in Wabash County, Indiana
Census-designated places in Indiana